Kandula Mallikharjuna Rao, better known as Mallik (1921–1996) was an Indian popular music composer and singer.

He was born to K. Venkatachalam and Lakshmi Narasamma. He was born in Machilipatnam, Krishna District, Andhra Pradesh. He received initial training in music from late Krovi Satyanarayana. He worked as a music composer and singer at All India Radio, Madras for 30 years. He later transferred to All India Radio, Vijayawada. While working at Akashvani, he composed for many songs, dance dramas, Bhakthi Ranjani songs and folk songs. He was the first composer of many reputed Tallapaka Annamacharya Keerthanas. Examples of such include Adigo Alladigo, Thandhanana Aahi, and Narayanathae Namo Namo. He also composed the famous Raja Rajeshwari Astakam, Hanuman Manjari. Dr.Vempati Chinna Satyam's Kuchipudi Dance Drama Chandalika for which music was composed by Mallik became a hit all over the world for its superb musical score.

In addition to being a composer, he was also a playback singer for Telugu movies, including the films Sampoorna Ramayanam, Charana Daasi, Bhagya Rekha (1957), and Bangaru Papa.

He was awarded Nada Kaumudi by ex-Prime Minister P. V. Narsimha Rao and ex-Chief Minister N. T. Rama Rao for his excellence.

He accompanied as a singer for many dance ballads for Sri Vempati Chinna Satyam, Smt. Shobha Naidu, and Smt. Raja Sulochana. He also performed many individual programs.

He participated in T.T.D. Brahmotsavams for 50 years.

References

1921 births
1996 deaths
Singers from Andhra Pradesh
People from Krishna district
Telugu playback singers
All India Radio people
20th-century Indian singers
Film musicians from Andhra Pradesh